The Dean L.C. Sears House was a historic house at 805 East Center Street in Searcy, Arkansas.  It was a -story wood-frame structure with English Revival architecture, built on campus in 1935 for Dean L.C. Sears, the first dean of Harding University after its move to Searcy from Morrilton.

The house was listed on the National Register of Historic Places in 1992.  It has been listed as destroyed in the Arkansas Historic Preservation Program database, and was delisted in 2018.

See also
National Register of Historic Places listings in White County, Arkansas

References

Houses on the National Register of Historic Places in Arkansas
Houses completed in 1935
Houses in Searcy, Arkansas
Demolished buildings and structures in Arkansas
National Register of Historic Places in Searcy, Arkansas
Former National Register of Historic Places in Arkansas
Harding University
Tudor Revival architecture in Arkansas